Mathewson State Forest covers  in Sheffield, Sutton and Wheelock, Vermont in Caledonia County. The forest is managed by the Vermont Department of Forests, Parks, and Recreation for timber resources and wildlife habitat. 

Activities in the park include hunting, snowmobiling, primitive camping, hiking, horseback riding and mountain biking.

References

External links
Official website

Vermont state forests
Protected areas of Caledonia County, Vermont
Sheffield, Vermont
Sutton, Vermont
Wheelock, Vermont